The 2008–09 Scottish Cup was the 124th season of Scotland's most prestigious football knockout competition. The winners were Rangers, who defeated Falkirk in the 2009 final on 30 May 2009.

The competition was under new sponsorship. While the SFA sponsored the tournament last season, the new sponsor was Homecoming Scotland 2009, a project from the Scottish Government to encourage Scots from all over the world to visit the country. The tournament itself was known as The Homecoming Scottish Cup

Banks o' Dee, Bathgate Thistle, Lochee United and Pollok were the four junior clubs that entered this season.

Calendar

First round
The First Round draw was conducted at Castlehead High School, Paisley on 8 September 2008.

Source: ESPN Soccernet

Replays

Source: ESPN Soccernet

Second round
The Second Round draw was conducted at Lochee United's Thomson Park, Dundee on 27 September 2008.

Replays

Source: ESPN Soccernet

Third round
The Third Round draw was conducted on 27 October 2008. Six matches were postponed, all because of frozen pitches. They were rescheduled for the following Saturday. However, only two of those matches were played on that day, Elgin City v Spartans and Forres Mechanics v Dalbeattie Star. The other matches were repeatedly postponed because of poor weather. The Edinburgh City v Brechin City tie was eventually played on 8 December 2008 and the Inverurie Loco Works v Vale of Leithen tie on 13 December 2008. The Lochee United v Ayr United match was played on Tuesday, 23 December 2008.

On 11 December 2008, the match between Elgin City and Spartans was ordered to be replayed after Elgin had fielded Joe Malin, a loanee from Ross County, in a 2–1 win. Malin was not registered in time for the original tie, but played in the rescheduled tie. The match was ordered to be played on 15 December. It later emerged that Spartans had also fielded an ineligible player, Dean Hoskins, after an administrative error.

Source: ESPN Soccernet:,

Replays

Fourth round
The Fourth Round Draw was conducted on 1 December 2008. Three matches were postponed due to failed pitch inspections, The first postponement, Inverurie Loco Works v Motherwell was rescheduled for 21 January but was not played (following 2 further postponements) until 2 February, whereas the Brechin City v St Mirren and Forfar Athletic v Forres Mechanics fixtures were both scheduled and played on 13 January.

Replays

Source: ESPN Soccernet: ,

Fifth round
The Fifth Round Draw was conducted on 11 January 2009 at Hibernian's Easter Road. Three matches were postponed, the Aberdeen v East Fife match because of adverse weather in and around the city, and the Airdrie United v Dunfermline Athletic and Forfar Athletic v Rangers because of frozen pitches. All have been rescheduled for 18 February.

Replay

Source: ESPN Soccernet

Quarter-finals
The Quarter-final draw was conducted on 9 February 2009 at Hampden Park.

Replay

Semi-finals
The Semi-final draw was conducted on 8 March 2009 at Ibrox Stadium.

Final

Media coverage
 Domestically, both Sky Sports and BBC Sport Scotland broadcast selected live games, with both showing the final. Both also carry highlights of all games in every round.
 BBC Radio Scotland has exclusive domestic radio rights to the tournament.
 Through the SFA's international media partner IMG, the Scottish Cup is broadcast in various territories around the world. In Australia, for example, the Scottish Cup is currently available on Setanta Sports.

References

Scottish Cup seasons
Scottish Cup, 2008-09
Scottish Cup, 2008-09